Hippothoidae is a family of bryozoans belonging to the order Cheilostomatida.

Genera:
 Antarctothoa Moyano, 1987
 Austrothoa Moyano, 1987
 Celleporella Gray, 1848
 Dacryoporella Bassler, 1935
 Dacryoporella Lang, 1934
 Haplota Marcus, 1940
 Hippothoa Lamouroux, 1821
 Jessethoa Gordon, 2020
 Laterotecatia Voigt, 1979
 Neothoa Moyano, 1987
 Plesiothoa Gordon & Hastings, 1979

References

Bryozoan families